Leonard Mason may refer to:
Leonard Edward Mason, American anthropologist
Leonard F. Mason, United States Marine Corps soldier and Medal of Honor recipient
USS Leonard F. Mason (DD-852)
Len Mason (Leonard Tasman Mason), New Zealand rugby league player